Clifton G. Parker (October 2, 1906 – April 19, 1988) was a Vermont attorney and politician who served as Vermont Attorney General for three terms.

Biography
Clifton Goodrich Parker was born in Wolcott, Vermont on October 2, 1906, the son of H. Alton and Katie (Goodrich) Parker.  He graduated from Hardwick Academy, and became a clerk for a local judge.  He then studied law at the office of attorney James Campbell in St. Johnsbury, and attained admission to the bar in 1935.  He practiced law in Morrisville, initially as the partner of Frederick G. Fleetwood, and later as a sole practitioner.

A Republican, Parker served as state's attorney of Lamoille County from 1936 to 1941.

In 1939, he was appointed first assistant clerk of the Vermont House of Representatives, and he served until 1941. In 1943 he was elected Clerk of the House as the replacement for Harold J. Arthur during Arthur's military service for World War II.  Parker served as Clerk until 1947, when he was succeeded by Arthur.

In December 1941 he accepted Alban J. Parker’s (no relation) appointment as Vermont’s deputy attorney general, and he served until the end of Parker’s term in 1947.  In 1946, Clifton Parker was the successful Republican nominee to succeed Alban Parker.  He was reelected in 1948 and 1950, and served from 1947 until resigning effective December 31, 1952.  He was succeeded by F. Elliott Barber Jr., who won the 1952 election for the term beginning in January 1953; the Governor of Vermont appointed Barber to fill the vacancy caused by Parker's resignation.

He was active in the Vermont Bar Association, and served as its president from 1959 to 1960.  In addition, he was a member of the state Board of Bar Examiners for several years.  Parker was also active in local government for both Morrisville and Morristown, including serving on the water and power commission, town attorney, and town meeting moderator.

Parker was an amateur radio operator and a licensed boat captain; during World War II he invented a navigational device which was used by the United States Navy, and he also designed several railroad radio communication systems.

Parker died in Burlington on April 19, 1988.  He was buried at Pleasant View Cemetery in Morrisville.

Family
In 1926, Parker was married to Florence Simmons, and they were the parents of six children – Dee, Robert, Charlotte, Arlyn, Carolyn, and William.

References

Sources

Books

Newspapers

Internet

1906 births
1988 deaths
People from Wolcott, Vermont
Vermont lawyers
Vermont Republicans
State's attorneys in Vermont
Vermont Attorneys General
Burials in Vermont
20th-century American lawyers